Pogoń Szczecin Spółka Akcyjna, commonly referred to as Pogoń Szczecin, is a Polish professional football club, based in Szczecin, West Pomeranian Voivodeship, which plays in the Ekstraklasa, the top tier of the national football league system.

History 
The club was founded by Poles from Lwów (now Lviv, Ukraine), who had been transferred west after the Soviet annexation of Poland's eastern territories in 1945. The founders of Pogoń Szczecin had previously been supporters of Pogoń Lwów and the colors of their new club reflect their old club. Polonia Bytom and Odra Opole were likewise founded or revived by the former inhabitants of Lwów.

The most popular sports organization in Szczecin was founded on 21 April 1948 as Klub Sportowy Sztorm. Its first departments were football and boxing, and the football team began playing in the local C-Klasa. In March 1949, several sports clubs in Szczecin (KS Sztorm, KS Cukrownik, KS Drukarz, Pocztowy KS) were merged into a large organization called Klub Sportowy Zwiazkowiec. The team of Zwiazkowiec joined local A-Class league, replacing Pocztowy KS. In November 1950, Zwiazkowiec was dissolved, and a new organization, Klub Sportowy Kolejarz Szczecin was formed. Its football team, supported by the Port of Szczecin, in 1953 was promoted to the newly created Interregional League (Liga Międzywojewódzka), which covered the provinces of Szczecin, Zielona Góra and Poznań.

In autumn 1955, Kolejarz was renamed into Pogoń Szczecin. The name and the hues of the club are a continuation of Pogoń Lwów. In 1957, Pogoń was runner up of the Interregional League, qualifying to the second division playoffs. After beating Flota Gdynia, Kujawiak Włocławek and Warta Gorzów, Pogoń for the first time won promotion to the second level of Polish football system. In 1958, Pogoń was the winner of Group North of the Second Division (37 points, goals 54–22, not a single game lost), winning promotion to the Ekstraklasa.

In its top level debut, Pogoń lost at home to Gwardia Warszawa 0–1. In 1960, Pogoń was relegated from the Ekstraklasa, to return there in 1962.

For most of the 1960s and 1970s, Pogoń remained in the top Polish league, but remained an average team, without any successes. This changed in the early 1980s: in 1981, Pogoń advanced to the final of the Polish Cup, to lose 0–1 to Legia Warsaw. In 1982, Pogoń again made it to the Polish Cup final, to lose 0–1 to Lech Poznań.

In 1984 Pogoń, managed by Eugeniusz Ksol, for the first time in history was among top three teams in the Ekstraklasa, which meant that the team qualified for the UEFA Cup. In its European debut, Pogoń faced 1. FC Köln, with such stars as Harald Schumacher, Pierre Littbarski and Klaus Allofs. In the first leg (September 19, 1984 in Cologne), Pogoń lost 1–2. In the second leg (October 3), Polish team lost 0–1, after its players failed to score on two penalty kicks.

In 1987, Pogoń was Polish runner-up. Managed by Leszek Jezierski, the team played offensively, scoring plenty of goals. With such players as Mariusz Kuras, Marek Ostrowski and Marek Leśniak, Pogoń was only behind Górnik Zabrze. In the first round of UEFA Cup, Pogon faced Hellas Verona, with Thomas Berthold and Preben Elkjær. In the first leg (September 16, 1987), Pogoń tied at home 1–1. Two weeks later, Polish team lost in Italy 1–3.

Pogoń in 2002 was on the brink of bankruptcy. As a result, fans created a new team on the basis of the reserves in the fourth division. However owner of Piotrcovia Piotrków Trybunalski Antoni Ptak decided to move the team and renamed the club MKS Pogoń Szczecin. The initial distrust was lost when the team performed well and used local players, however halfway through the 2005–06 season the team started underperforming and Ptak decided to replace almost the entire squad with only Brazilian nationals, making it the "most Brazilian team outside Brazil". The experiment failed and in 2007 Antoni Ptak moved away from football, leaving the club to be rebuilt on the basis of the 4th division counterpart set up originally by the fans, which acted as the reserve team in the meantime.

The club was promoted to the Zachodnia (Western) group of the new II Liga (formerly the Third League) for the 2007–08 season. The club earned promotion to the Polish First League after finishing 2nd in Western Group of Polish Second League in 2008–09 season. Despite playing on the second tier, Pogoń performed well in the 2009–10 Polish Cup, defeating top division teams Polonia Warsaw, Piast Gliwice and Ruch Chorzów to reach the final, to lose 0–1 to Jagiellonia Białystok. Finally Pogoń returned to the top division after finishing the First League as runner-up in the 2011–12 season.

Since then, Pogoń has promoted a number of players to the Poland national team and transferred several players to stronger leagues, including Sebastian Walukiewicz to Serie A side Cagliari Calcio and Kacper Kozłowski to Premier League side Brighton & Hove Albion F.C. While still a Pogoń player, Kozłowski, aged 17 years and 246 days, became the youngest-ever player to play at the European Championship, when he capped for Poland against Spain in June 2021. From 2020, Pogoń re-established itself as one of the top teams in the country, finishing third in the league twice in a row (2020–21, 2021–22).

Crest and colours

The club's colours are navy blue and maroon. Incorporated into the club's crest, they are derived from Pogoń Lwów, from which Pogoń Szczecin also took its name. The crowned griffin in the crest comes from the coat of arms of the city of Szczecin. Additionally, the crest contains the name "Pogoń" and the year of the club's foundation, i.e. 1948.

The club mascot Gryfus is a red crowned griffin, also derived from the coat of arms of Szczecin.

Honours

Domestic 
Ekstraklasa
Runners-up (2): 1986–87, 2000–01
Third place (3): 1983–84, 2020–21, 2021–22

Polish Cup
Runners-up (3): 1980–81, 1981–82, 2009–10

International 
First Round of the 1984–85 UEFA Cup and the 1987–88 UEFA Cup
Qualifying Round of the 2001–02 UEFA Cup
Second Round of the 2005 UEFA Intertoto Cup

Youth Team 
Polish U-19 Champion: 
 1986, 2021
 Polish U-19 Runner Up: 
 1965, 2016, 2017
 Polish U-19 Bronze Medal: 
 1960, 2008, 2012, 2014
 Polish U-17 Bronze Medal: 
 2002

Pogoń Szczecin in European football

Results

Players

Current squad

Out on loan

Former notable players

Managers 

 Jan Dixa (1950)
 Kazimierz Chrostek (1951–1952)
 Zygmunt Czyżewski (1953)
 Henryk Wielga (1954)
 Michał Matyas (1955–1956)
 Florian Krygier (1956–1958)
 Edward Brzozowski (1959)
 Florian Krygier (1960)
 Edward Brzozowski (1960–1961)
 Zygmunt Czyżewski (1962–1963)
 Marian Suchogórski (1963–1965)
 Stefan Żywotko (1965–1970)
 Eugeniusz Ksol (1970)
 Karel Kosarz (1970–1972)
 Edmund Zientara (1972–1975)
 Bogusław Hajdas (1975–1977)
 Aleksander Mandziara (1977–1978)
 Hubert Fiałkowski (1978)
 Konstanty Pawlikaniec (1979)
 Jerzy Kopa (Oct 20, 1979 – June 30, 1982)
 Eugeniusz Ksol (1982–1985)
 Maciej Hejn (1985)
 Leszek Jezierski (1985–1987)
 Jan Jucha (1987–1988)
 Jerzy Jatczak (1988)
 Lesław Ćmikiewicz (July 1, 1988 – April 10, 1989)
 Eugeniusz Ksol (1989)
 Włodzimierz Obst (1989–1990)
 Aleksander Brożyniak (1990)
 Jerzy Jatczak (1990)
 Eugeniusz Różański (1991–1992)
 Leszek Jezierski (1992)
 Roman Szukiełowicz (1992–1993)
 Jerzy Kasalik (Dec 22, 1993 – Dec 31, 1994)
 Orest Lenczyk (Jan 1, 1995 – July 1, 1995)
 Janusz Pekowski (1995–1996)
 Roman Szukiełowicz (1996–1997)
 Bogusław Baniak (July 1, 1997 – April 7, 1999)
 Albin Mikulski (July 1, 1999 – April 16, 2000)
 Mariusz Kuras (April 17, 2000 – June 30, 2000)
 Edward Lorens (July 20, 2000 – April 29, 2001)
 Mariusz Kuras (April 29, 2001 – June 14, 2002)
 Albin Mikulski (June 14, 2002 – Sept 3, 2002)
 Jerzy Wyrobek (Sept 4, 2002 – July 1, 2003)
 Bogusław Baniak (July 1, 2003 – July 1, 2004)
 Pavel Malura (July 1, 2004 – Aug 9, 2004)
 Bohumil Páník (Oct 8, 2004 – April 18, 2005)
 Bogusław Pietrzak (May 11, 2005 – Aug 23, 2005)
 Bohumil Páník (Aug 2005 – Feb 1906)
 José Carlos Serrão (Dec 15, 2005 – March 1, 2006)
 Bohumil Páník (March 2006 – April 6)
 Mariusz Kuras (April 18, 2006 – Dec 11, 2006)
 Libor Pala (Dec 21, 2006 – March 21, 2007)
 Bogusław Baniak (March 21, 2007 – June 30, 2007)
 Marcin Kaczmarek (July 2007 – Dec 2007)
 Mariusz Kuras (Dec 30, 2007 – Sept 15, 2008)
 Piotr Mandrysz (Sept 15, 2008 – Aug 17, 2010)
 Maciej Stolarczyk (Aug 17, 2010 – Nov 9, 2010)
 Artur Płatek (Nov 10, 2010 – June 30, 2011)
 Marcin Sasal (May 30, 2011 – April 10, 2012)
 Ryszard Tarasiewicz (April 10, 2012 – June 30, 2012)
 Artur Skowronek (July 1, 2012 – March 19, 2013)
 Dariusz Wdowczyk (March 20, 2013 – Oct 21, 2014)
 Ján Kocian (Oct 22, 2014 – April 8, 2015)
 Czesław Michniewicz (April 9, 2015 – June 30, 2016)
 Kazimierz Moskal (May 24, 2016 – June 30, 2017)
 Maciej Skorża (July 1, 2017 – October 30, 2017)
 Kosta Runjaić  (30.11.2017–23.05.2022 )
 Jens Gustafsson (July 1, 2022 – )

See also 
 Football in Poland

References 

5.https://gol24.pl/oficjalnie-jens-gustafsson-zostal-nowym-trenerem-pilkarzy-pogoni-szczecin/ar/c2-16330757

External links 

  
 Pogoń Szczecin at 90minut.pl 

 
Sport in Szczecin
Association football clubs established in 1948
1948 establishments in Poland